The Coptic Orthodox Diocese of the Midlands, UK is under the care of Bishop Missael.

Background and Foundation
 In 1991 the first Coptic Orthodox Diocese to be established in the United Kingdom, and one of the first in the diaspora, was the Diocese of the Midlands, UK (although at the time known as the Diocese of Birmingham). Pope Shenouda III appointed Bishop Missael (who was at the time a General Bishop) to oversee this Diocese, which he has continued to do to this day.

The Diocese is headquartered at St. Mary & St. Mark's Coptic Orthodox Centre in Birmingham where the bishop also resides.

The seal of the Diocese depicts a crucifix and fish based on the ancient 4th-5th century limestone Coptic engraving currently situated in the Louvre Museum, France.

Regions in the United Kingdom that fall under the Coptic Orthodox Diocese of the Midlands, UK. are as follows:

Cheshire
Cumbria
Derbyshire
Gloucestershire
Greater Manchester
Herefordshire
Lancashire
Leicestershire
Lincolnshire
Merseyside
Northamptonshire
North Wales
Nottinghamshire
Oxfordshire
Rutland
Staffordshire
Shropshire
Warwickshire
West Midlands
Worcestershire

Bishop Missael
Before becoming Bishop of the Diocese, Bishop Missael consecrated St. Mary & St. Antony's Coptic Church in 1985, and established the Coptic Orthodox Centre in Birmingham in 1989. These later formed part of the early Diocese.

On 26 May 1991, Bishop Missael was consecrated as Bishop of the Diocese of Birmingham, by Pope Shenouda III. In 2006, the Diocese was renamed "the Diocese of the Midlands" (in the United Kingdom).

The Diocese was the first Diocese under the Coptic Orthodox Patriarchate to be established in the United Kingdom and one of the first in all the lands of immigration (Europe, America, Australia). Following its establishment by Pope Shenouda III, the Diocese of Ireland, Scotland and North East England (Bishop Antony) was formed and Bishop Angaelos was ordained a general bishop over Stevenage in 1995 and 1999 respectively.  Thus, Bishop Missael became the first permanent Coptic Orthodox bishop to serve the United Kingdom.

Other Clergy
 the diocese has nine priests. In order of their appointment:

 Hegumen Fr. Youhanna (John)
 Hegumen Fr. Bishoy  
 Hegumen Fr. Peter 
 Hegumen Fr. John 
 Hegumen Fr. Anthony
 Hegumen Fr. Hedra
 Fr. Peter Farrington
 Fr. George
 Fr. David

In 2015, Bishop Missael appointed an Archdeacon in Birmingham to serve St. Mary & Archangel Michael's Cathedral.

There are also three deacons ordained to assist the bishop and priests.

Churches and Missions
The Diocese has 8 Churches and also other missions (communities that it serves):

St. Mary & St. Mark's Coptic Orthodox Centre, Birmingham
St. Mary & Archangel Michael's Coptic Orthodox Cathedral, Birmingham
St. Mary & St. Antony's Coptic Orthodox Church, Birmingham
St. Mary & St. Mina's Coptic Orthodox Church, Manchester
St. Mary & St. George's Coptic Orthodox Church, Nottingham
St. Mary & St. Abaskhyron's Coptic Orthodox Church, Llandudno
St. Mary & St. Cyril's Coptic Orthodox Church, Liverpool
St. Mary & St. Philopater's Coptic Orthodox Church, Bolton
Community in Central Birmingham
Community in Stoke-on-Trent 
Community in Leicester
Community in Oxford
Community in Northampton
Community in Derby
Community in Worcester

See also
Coptic Orthodox Church of Alexandria
Coptic Orthodox Church in Europe
Coptic Orthodox Church in Britain and Ireland
Bishop Missael

External links
Official Website of the Coptic Orthodox Diocese of the Midlands, U.K.

References

Coptic Orthodox Church in the United Kingdom